Minuscule 602 (in the Gregory-Aland numbering), α 61 (von Soden), is a Greek minuscule manuscript of the New Testament, on parchment. Palaeographically it has been assigned to the 10th century. The manuscript is very lacunose. Formerly it was labeled by 122a and 143p.

Description 

The codex contains the text of the Acts of the Apostles, Catholic epistles, Pauline epistles on 248 parchment leaves (size ), with numerous lacunae (James, Philipians-2 Thess., 2 Timothy-Hebrews). The text is written in one column per page, 17 lines per page.

 Contents
Acts 13:48-15:22; 15:29-16:36; 17:4-18:26; 20:16-28:17; 1 Peter 2:20-3:2; 3:17-5:14; 2 Peter 1:1-3.18; 1 John 1:1-3:5; 3:21-5:9; 2 John 8-13; 3 John 1-10; Jude 7-25; Romans 1:1-4:16; 4:24-7:9; 7:18-16:24; 1 Cor 1:1-28; 2:13-8:1; 9:6-14:2; 14:10-16:24; 2 Cor 1:1-13:13; Gal 1:1-10; 2:4-6:18; Eph 1:1-18; 1 Ti 1:14-5:5.

Text 

The Greek text of the codex is a representative of the Byzantine text-type. Aland placed it in Category V.

History 

The manuscript was added to the list of New Testament manuscripts by Johann Martin Augustin Scholz. It was examined and described by Paulin Martin. Gregory saw the manuscript in 1885.

The manuscript currently is housed at the Bibliothèque nationale de France (Gr. 105), at Paris.

See also 

 List of New Testament minuscules
 Biblical manuscript
 Textual criticism

References

Further reading 

 W. H. Hatch, Facsimiles and descriptions of minuscule manuscripts of the New Testament (Cambridge, 1951), XXI.

Greek New Testament minuscules
10th-century biblical manuscripts
Bibliothèque nationale de France collections